Tréhet is a former commune of the Loir-et-Cher department in central France. On 1 January 2019, it was merged into the new commune Vallée-de-Ronsard.

Geography
The commune is situated on the left bank of the Loir close to the Sarthe department communes of La Chartre-sur-le-Loir and Ruillé-sur-Loir and is traversed by the Niclos stream.

Etymology
The name derives from Latin trajectus (crossing).

Population

Sights
Its small partly Romanesque church is dedicated to Mary has recently been restored, revealing early wall paintings (the subject is the martyrdom of St. Lawrence).

See also
Communes of the Loir-et-Cher department

References

Former communes of Loir-et-Cher